Verden is a town in western Grady County, Oklahoma, United States. It abuts the Caddo County line, and is probably best known as the site of the 1865 Camp Napoleon Council. The population was 530 at the 2010 census, a decline from 659 in 2000.

History
A rural community called "Cottonwood Grove" began to emerge near the present site of Verden before the Civil War. It was on the eastern edge of the Kiowa and Comanche reservation that was established by the Medicine Lodge Treaty, that was made with the U.S. government in 1867. A stage stop was established at Cottonwood Grove for travelers en route from Boggy Depot to the Kiowa Agency, Fort Sill, and Fort Cobb. The land around the community, outside the reservation, belonged to the Half Moon Ranch, owned by W. G. "Caddo" Williams. His son-in-law, Charles Campbell, owner of the 7BC Ranch, and E. B. Johnson bought the Half Moon around 1900.

The Chicago, Rock Island and Pacific Railroad (a.k.a. CRI&P or Rock Island Railroad) built tracks through this area, between Chickasha and Mangum in 1900. James N. Jones and his family claimed the land around Cottonwood Grove when the tribes living near the Kiowa Agency were allowed to claim their land allotments. A post office was established at Cottonwood Grove, in 1899, but was discontinued in 1900. Another post office was established in 1902, which was named "Verden", because there was another Cottonwood Grove post office elsewhere in the Oklahoma Territory. The town was platted in 1904, and A. A. Hiatt sold the lots for the CRI&P townsite division. In 1907, Verden became a town incorporated in Oklahoma Territory by the commissioners of Caddo County, and had a population of 312.

Agriculture has been the main economic activity in Verden since its founding, and the railroad made Verden an important shipping point for products of the farms and ranches. The town's public school began in 1905 and absorbed a Caddo County district in 1917. By 1910, the population had climbed to 524 and the town had two banks, a newspaper, the Verden News, a telephone connection, an electric company, a grain elevator, a cotton yard, a cotton gin, a milling company, a lumberyard, and several retail outlets. The business district had survived a major fire in 1908. It also survived several floods that plagued the Washita River valley.

Geography
Verden is located in western Grady County at  (35.083762, -98.088790).

The town's western border follows the Caddo County line, and the Washita River flows to the east just outside the northern border of the town.

Demographics

As of the census of 2000, there were 659 people, 246 households, and 182 families residing in the town. There were 280 housing units at an average density of 870.0 per square mile (337.8/km2). The racial makeup of the town was 90.44% White, 6.07% Native American, 0.15% Asian, 0.15% from other races, and 3.19% from two or more races. Hispanic or Latino of any race were 0.61% of the population.

There were 246 households, out of which 38.6% had children under the age of 18 living with them, 59.3% were married couples living together, 9.3% had a female householder with no husband present, and 26.0% were non-families. 24.0% of all households were made up of individuals, and 9.3% had someone living alone who was 65 years of age or older. The average household size was 2.68 and the average family size was 3.14.

In the town, the population was spread out, with 32.0% under the age of 18, 6.4% from 18 to 24, 29.7% from 25 to 44, 19.3% from 45 to 64, and 12.6% who were 65 years of age or older. The median age was 34 years. For every 100 females, there were 83.1 males. For every 100 females age 18 and over, there were 88.2 males.

The median income for a household in the town was $23,667, and the median income for a family was $26,833. Males had a median income of $24,063 versus $20,469 for females. The per capita income for the town was $11,617. About 11.6% of families and 13.4% of the population were below the poverty line, including 11.3% of those under age 18 and 10.3% of those age 65 or over.

Education
Verden resident Allen Toles was an African American farmer who had become a landowner through the Homestead Act of 1862. He built the Verden Separate School on his own property in 1910 as a school for black children. The school operated until 1935. The school building was rediscovered by historians in 2004 and restored and relocated to nearby Chickasha. It was placed on the National Register of Historic Places in 2005.

Utilities 
 Telephone, Internet, and Digital TV Services is provided by Hilliary Communications.

See also
Camp Napoleon Council

References

Towns in Grady County, Oklahoma
Towns in Oklahoma
Populated places established in 1902